At the 1948 Winter Olympics in St. Moritz, a winter pentathlon competition was held.  It was one of two demonstration sports held at these Games.

The pentathlon was composed of five segments:
cross-country skiing
shooting
downhill skiing
fencing
horse riding

Results

Medal table

References

1948 Winter Olympics events
Olympics
Discontinued sports at the Winter Olympics
Pentathlon
Men's events at the 1948 Winter Olympics